Daur Tarba is the current Minister for Agriculture of Abkhazia. In the past, he has also been Chairman of United Abkhazia at a time when it was the ruling party, Vice Premier and head of the Ochamchira District.

Career
After the election of Sergei Bagapsh as president of Abkhazia, Tarba was appointed head of the State Committee for State Property and Privatisation 24 February 2005. On 3 April 2007 Tarba was appointed head of the Ochamchira District. On 18 December 2008 Tarba was at his own request released from this post, and on 27 January 2009, during the congress in which the socio-political movement United Abkhazia was transformed into a political party, Tarba became its new chairman.

After the re-election of Sergei Bagapsh, Tarba was appointed Vice Premier on 24 February 2010. However, on 25 February 2011, Tarba announced that he was resigning, without specifying his reasons. His resignation was approved by President Bagapsh on 4 March. On 30 March, he was succeeded by Minister for Taxes and Levies Vakhtang Pipia.

Tarba resigned as Chairman of United Abkhazia on 1 October 2015 in a letter to its political council, in which he identified excessive formalism and a lack of internal political debates, and called for the party's rejuvenation. The political council accepted his resignation and appointed Aleksei Tania as acting Chairman.

In the sidelines of the party congress that followed Tarba's resignation, it was said that Tarba had resigned specifically to make room for his successor, long-time friend, former Prime Minister and sitting MP Sergei Shamba.

On 24 August 2016, Tarba was appointed Agriculture Minister in the cabinet of new Prime Minister Beslan Bartsits, succeeding Timur Eshba.

References

Living people
United Abkhazia politicians
Vice Premiers of Abkhazia
3rd convocation of the People's Assembly of Abkhazia
1st convocation of the People's Assembly of Abkhazia
Chairmen of the State Committee for State Property Management and Privatisation of Abkhazia
Heads of Ochamchira District
Ministers for Agriculture of Abkhazia
Year of birth missing (living people)